Djolé (also known as Jolé or Yolé) is a mask-dance from Temine people in Sierra Leone. It is played traditionally with a large square drum called .

Although a mask depicts a female, it is carried by a male.

Djolé is played usually during big feasts which involve many villages to celebrate a good harvest, the end of the Ramadan or a marriage.

Nowadays the rhythm has been rearranged to be played with the djembé and is very popular in particular in Guinea.

Lyrics

References

External links
 Djolé rhythm samples
 Djolé rhythms
 Cultural Context for Djembé Rhythms
 Djolé rhythm page on www.djembefola.fr

African dances
Sierra Leonean music